Ghani (asomtavruli , nuskhuri , mkhedruli ღ) is the 26th letter of the three Georgian scripts.

In the system of Georgian numerals it has a value of 700.

Ghani commonly represents the voiced velar fricative , like the pronunciation of French-like R.

Letter

Stroke order

Computer encodings

Braille

Use
It is frequently used as a love or heart symbol in online communications.

See also
Ğ, Latin letter

References

Bibliography
Mchedlidze, T. (1) The restored Georgian alphabet, Fulda, Germany, 2013
Mchedlidze, T. (2) The Georgian script; Dictionary and guide, Fulda, Germany, 2013
Machavariani, E. Georgian manuscripts, Tbilisi, 2011
The Unicode Standard, Version 6.3, (1) Georgian, 1991-2013
The Unicode Standard, Version 6.3, (2) Georgian Supplement, 1991-2013

Georgian letters